Supreme Courts of Austria may refer to:
 Constitutional Court (Austria), tribunal responsible for the judicial review of legal matters relating to the Constitution
 Supreme Court of Justice (Austria), court of last resort for criminal and civil lawsuits other than administrative
 Supreme Administrative Court (Austria), court of last resort for administrative lawsuits

See also 
 Judiciary of Austria
 Supreme court